Waltham was a railway station on the East Lincolnshire Railway which served the villages of New Waltham and Humberston in Lincolnshire between 1848 and 1964. It was originally named Waltham and Humberstone, but Humberstone was dropped soon after opening. The line through Waltham remained open for freight until December 1980.

History
It was constructed by contractor John Waring and Sons of Rotherham who, in December 1846, had agreed to construct the line for the sum of £46,102. The architects of the station buildings were John Grey Weightman and Matthew Ellison Hadfield of Sheffield.

The station was initially named Waltham and Humberstone, although it was in fact two miles from each village. It consisted of staggered platforms either side of a level crossing; the down platform to the north and the up to the south. The stationhouse, which was visible from the road, was situated on the south side of the crossing, on the down side of the line. Opposite, at the end of the  lay a signal box of typical East Lincolnshire Railway construction; this controlled the crossing and a small goods yard adjacent to the down line. The yard initially handled coal and potatoes, but was later expanded to take cattle with the addition of a large cattle holding pen at its southern end. The goods yard was served by a single siding trailing off the down line which forked either side of the cattle pen. A row of three terraced railwayman's cottages were built on the south side of the crossing, adjacent to the signal box.

The arrival of the railway at Waltham led to the development of the area around the station and the creation of a thriving village known as New Waltham. The parish of New Waltham was created in 1961. The July 1922 timetable saw 13 up and down weekday services, plus one Sunday service each way, call at Waltham. The station closed to passengers on 11 September 1961, with the goods yard remaining open until 15 June 1964. The line through Waltham was closed at the end of 1980.

Present day
Tracklifting commenced in early 1981, with the section between Grimsby and Waltham - constructed of bullhead rail - being the last to be removed. This section was designated by Humberside County Council for the building of the A16 Peaks Parkway. The roadworks put an end to hopes by the Great Northern and East Lincolnshire Railway plc to put the railway back in to Grimsby.

The station site survived largely intact until 2009 when, following a structural survey, it was determined that the Station House was beyond restoration due to water damage in the foundation level and would have to be demolished. The Station House was deconstructed and rebuilt on exactly the same foot print after the footings were raised 4 feet to match the average level of New waltham and many of the original features returned to the exterior. The rebuilt house retains the name of "Station House". The former goods yard with 7 new houses built on the original grounds is now called "Station Mews" and involving the construction of eight properties (including the station house reconstruction) accessed by a private road, although has not been fully completed to this date by the developer "Station Mews Development Company". The original three terraced cottages with outbuildings, adjacent to the up platform and signal box, survive to this day.

On 28 September 1991, a Light Railway Order was obtained which authorises the reinstatement of the East Lincolnshire Railway between Waltham and the former Keddington Road level crossing near Louth. The Lincolnshire Wolds Railway had intended on opening a station at Waltham. However, as developers have built over the track bed to the south at Holton-le-Clay and at Waltham itself, it is now impossible to re-lay the track as far as Waltham.

References

Sources

External links
 Waltham station on navigable 1946 O. S. map

Disused railway stations in the Borough of North East Lincolnshire
Railway stations in Great Britain closed in 1961
Railway stations in Great Britain opened in 1848
Former Great Northern Railway stations
John Grey Weightman railway stations
Matthew Ellison Hadfield railway stations